Buddhist (1886 – December 30, 1893) was an American Thoroughbred racehorse who won the 1889 Preakness Stakes at the Pimlico Race Course in Baltimore, Maryland. Buddhist's sire and dam were Hindoo and Emma Hanly. Buddhist's was bred in Kentucky by Ezekiel F. Clay & Catesby Woodford and his owner was Samuel S. Brown. He was trained by future U.S. Racing Hall of Fame inductee, John W. Rogers.

Buddhist's jockey, George "Spider" Anderson, is considered among the great African American jockeys in horse racing history. On May 10, 1889, Anderson and Buddhist finished the race with an astonishing time of 2:17.50 and became the 17th winners of the Preakness Stakes. Buddhist made Preakness history by having one of the largest winning margins when he won the race by eight lengths. Buddhist died in a stable fire on December 30, 1893, that also killed 11 other horses at C. V. Hollar's Bishop Farm.

Pedigree

See also
 Hindus (horse)

References

1886 racehorse births
1893 racehorse deaths
Racehorses bred in Kentucky
Racehorses trained in the United States
Thoroughbred family A22
Preakness Stakes winners
Byerley Turk sire line